Jeffrey Thomas "Jeff" Pain (born December 14, 1970) is an American-born Canadian former skeleton racer who competed from 1995 to 2010. He is regarded as one of the most successful male competitors in the history of the Canadian skeleton program. He was born in Anchorage, Alaska.

He graduated from the University of British Columbia, where he was a member of the school's varsity track and field team.

Pain has had a 15-year career with 22 World Cup podium finishes in 74 starts, including ten wins, 3 World Championship medals, and an Olympic silver medal. This included winning the men's Skeleton World Cup overall title twice (2004-5, 2005-6). He first represented Canada at the 2002 Olympic Winter games finishing 6th, where Skeleton returned after a 54-year hiatus.  Then Pain went on to compete in the 2006 Winter Olympics where he finished with a silver medal behind fellow Canadian Duff Gibson. One distinguishing feature of Pain's skeleton gear is his custom-painted helmet, depicting the face of an enraged beaver.  Pain was married to his wife Aly in 1997 and they have two sons.

Jeff and Aly released their first book, "The Business of Marriage & Medals" - A Relationship's Journey through Elite Performance.  This book is a raw and honest account of the couples marriage while dealing with tremendous sacrifice and extended time apart.

Pain also won three medals in the men's skeleton event at the FIBT World Championships with two golds (2003, 2005) and a silver (2001).

He finished in ninth place at the 2010 Winter Olympics; racing with a badly injured right Oblique muscle. In October 2010, he announced his retirement from competition.

In 2015 Pain was appointed as coach of the Chinese skeleton team, after the 2022 Winter Olympics were awarded to Beijing.

References

Other sources
 
 Men's skeleton Olympic medalists since 1928 (sports123.com)

External links
 
 
 
 

1970 births
Living people
American expatriate sportspeople in Canada
American male skeleton racers
Canadian male skeleton racers
Olympic silver medalists for Canada
Olympic skeleton racers of Canada
Sportspeople from Anchorage, Alaska
Skeleton racers at the 2002 Winter Olympics
Skeleton racers at the 2006 Winter Olympics
Skeleton racers at the 2010 Winter Olympics
Olympic medalists in skeleton
University of British Columbia alumni
Medalists at the 2006 Winter Olympics
Canadian sports coaches